Petros Tsitsipas (born 27 July 2000) is a Greek professional tennis player. He has a career-high ATP doubles ranking of No. 137, achieved on 30 January 2023, and also has a career-high ATP singles ranking of No. 727, achieved on 30 August 2021. Tsitsipas represents Greece at the Davis Cup, where he has a W–L record of 10–9. Petros is the younger brother of Stefanos Tsitsipas.

Career

2021–2023: ATP singles and doubles debut, 14 wildcards in doubles
The brothers first partnered at the 2021 Australian Open, where they received their first team wildcard to the main draw but lost in the first round. The next two tournaments were the 2021 Rotterdam Open and 2021 Open 13 Provence in Marseille, France where they entered as main draw wildcards and lost in the second and first rounds respectively.

Petros made his ATP singles debut as a wildcard as well to the main draw of the event at the 2021 Open 13, but lost to Alejandro Davidovich Fokina in the first round in 45 minutes. The misuse of wildcards in that case of Petros Tsitsipas individually and in general for the brothers has been brought up by players and fans.

They next partnered at the 2021 Monte-Carlo Masters after receiving a fourth team wildcard to the event. They reached the round of 16 by beating 8th seeded Kevin Krawietz and Horia Tecău. The pair received yet another wildcard for the next Masters 1000 at the 2021 Mutua Madrid Open but lost again in the first round. They served as alternates in a third Masters in a row at the Italian Open but lost for the fourth time in the first round. At the 2021 ATP Lyon Open, Petros and Stefanos received their sixth wildcard in doubles but lost the first round match. This was the fifth loss in seven tournaments, in the first round, since the beginning of the year.

The brothers received their second Grand Slam and seventh wildcard for the year at the 2021 Wimbledon Championships, losing in the first round. They also received their eight wildcard at the 2021 Hamburg European Open, losing in the first round.

They received two more wildcards at the 2022 Monte-Carlo Masters and 2022 Mutua Madrid Open, where they lost in the second and first rounds respectively. They also received their eleventh and twelfth wildcard in  Stuttgart and at the 2022 Mallorca Championships where they also lost in the second and first rounds respectively.
They entered the 2022 US Open as an alternate pair where they lost in the first round. 

They received a wildcard at the 2023 ABN AMRO Open in Rotterdam, their thirteenth in two years, where they lost in the first round.

Petros Tsitsipas again partnering French Luca Sanchez received a wildcard to the main draw of the 2023 Open 13 Provence in Marseille.

Doubles performance timeline

ATP Challenger and ITF Futures Finals

Singles: 1 (0–1)

Doubles: 15 (9–6)

References

External links
 
 
 

2000 births
Living people
Greek male tennis players
Greek people of Russian descent
Sportspeople from Athens